Cucullaea elegans is an extinct species of false ark shells from the North of Germany.

References

External links
 Cucullaea elegans (Fischer) at gbif.org

Cucullaeidae
Fossil taxa described in 1836
Bivalves described in 1836